Miss Ranskill Comes Home is a novel by Barbara Euphan Todd. It was first published in 1946, under her married name, Barbara Bower.

Plot introduction
The novel tells the story of a woman who returns to England after being stranded on a desert island during the Second World War.

Reception
Rosamund Lehmann described it as "a work of great originality … a blend of fantasy, satire and romantic comedy".
The novel was reissued in 2003 by Persephone Books.

Notes

 Book Page at Persephone Books

1946 British novels
Chapman & Hall books